Meyab (also Romanized as Meyāb and Mīāb; also known as Mayu and Mīow) is a village in Miankuh Rural District, Chapeshlu District, Dargaz County, Razavi Khorasan Province, Iran. At the 2006 census, its population was 668, in 177 families.

References 

Populated places in Dargaz County